Football in Singapore started in the 1890s during the British colonial of Singapore. There have been various competitions over the years with the S.League as the leading national league of Singapore. It was founded in 1996 and took over the defunct FAS Premier League. The next tier is the Singapore National Football League or more commonly known as the NFL which is the longest national leagues in Singapore. An FAS Island Wide League was then formed to allow new teams to qualify for the NFL. Beside the national leagues, there have also been various amateur football leagues which gives opportunity for players who want to pursue their career in football or a platform for the former professional players to continue playing the beautiful game of football.

Men's National Leagues
The National Leagues in are the Singapore Premier League, FAS National Football League which consist of 2 Divisions and the FAS Island Wide League which is a National Football League qualifying tournament.

FAS Premier League Winners (1988–1995) 
The FAS Premier League was founded in 1988 and took over the NFL as a top domestic league of Singapore. It was disbanded in 1996 with the established of the professional S.League.

Singapore Premier League Winners (1996–present)

Singapore Football League Division 1/National Football League Division 1/First Division Winners

Singapore Football League Division 2/National Football League Division 2/Second Division Winners

Singapore Football League Division 3/National Football League Division 3/Third Division Winners

Singapore Island Wide League Winners (Third Division since 2014)

Singapore's Prime League Winners

Expatriate Leagues

Cosmopolitan League 
The Cosmopolitan League, or the Cosmoleague was founded in 1975 by a soccer section member of the Singapore Cricket Club. It is currently the top leading amateur football league in Singapore and is a league cater for both local and expatriate players who are not involved in the national leagues and residing in Singapore. There have been many well known retired or semi-retired professional footballers who have come to participate in this league over the years. Some of the most well known clubs participating in the Cosmoleague are Singapore Cricket Club, Singapore FC, Casuals FC Singapore and 1 Tanah Merah FC.

Equatorial Football League
Equatorial Football League is a multi-national football league founded in 2006. The league was previously sanctioned by Football Association of Singapore and consists of mainly expatriate football clubs with expatriate players. Well-known amateur football clubs such as Singapore Cricket Club, Singapore FC and Purple Monkeys FC have also participate in this league. The league consists of 4 divisions, the Saturday Qualification, Saturday Premiership, Sunday Qualification and Sunday Premiership divisions.

Past winners

Women's National Leagues

Women's Premier League

Women's National League

Women's Youth League

Women's Challenge Cup

National Cups' Winners

Singapore Cup Winners

Singapore Amateur Football Association Challenge Cup (1892-1967), FAS President Cup (1968-1993), Singapore FA Cup Winners (1994-Present)

National Football League Challenge Cup Winners

Singapore League Cup Winners

Note: 
Tampines Rovers SC is a separate entity from Tampines Rovers.
SAFSA is a separate entity from Singapore Armed Forces.
Police SA is a separate entity from Home United (formerly Police FC).

National Plate and Shield's Winners

Singapore Plate Winners
From 2012, a Plate Tournament was launched for the four teams that finished third in their respective groups.

Singapore Community Shield Winners

Central Of Excellence Developmental Football League
The Central of Excellence Developmental Football League or more commonly known as the COE League is a youth developmental league for the youth players of the S. League club. There are four categories of the league: U13, U14, U15, U16, U17 and U18.

League Winners and Runners-up (Until 2017)

Cup Winners

ESPZEN
ESPZEN is a soccer organization based in Singapore and is founded by an English banker named Lee Taylor back in the early 2000s. It is currently the biggest amateur football organization in Singapore with over 180 teams and 4000 players. Its main category leagues are the Sunday League, Saturday League and the Midweek League. It organizes veteran league for veteran players and junior leagues for kids. It is affiliated to the FAS.

Sunday League Past Winners

Saturday League Winners

Merlion Youth League
The Merlion Youth League, MYL is a youth football tournament founded in 2014. It is a tournament for youth who do not compete or who formerly competed in the FAS COE Developmental Football League. The clubs which took part in the league are amateur clubs or clubs which are associated with the NFL clubs.

League Winners and Runners-up

See also
 FAS Premier League
 Singapore Premier League
 Singapore FA Cup
 Singapore League Cup
 Prime League
 List of football clubs in Singapore
 Singapore National Football League
 Singapore football league system

Cup Winners

References

Defunct football competitions in Singapore
2